Jaleel Seve-Derbas is a Lebanon international rugby league footballer who plays for the Wests Tigers in the National Rugby League. He was selected to represent Lebanon in the 2017 Rugby League World Cup.

Early career and personal life
He played his junior rugby league for Cabramatta Two Blues. He is studying a Bachelor of Business at the University of Technology Sydney.

References

External links
Wests Tigers profile
2017 RLWC profile

1996 births
Living people
Australian people of Lebanese descent
Australian sportspeople of Samoan descent
Australian rugby league players
Lebanon national rugby league team players
Rugby league second-rows
Wests Tigers NSW Cup players